Siccia cretata is a moth in the family Erebidae. It was described by George Hampson in 1914. It is found in Ghana, Kenya, Sierra Leone and Uganda.

The larvae have been recorded feeding on lichens.

References

Moths described in 1914
Nudariina